William Henry Goodyear (1846–1923) was a noted architectural historian, art historian, and museum curator. He was the son of Charles Goodyear (1800–1860), inventor of rubber vulcanization, and Clarissa Beecher Goodyear.

Goodyear was born in New Haven, Connecticut, spent much of his childhood in England and France, and graduated from Yale University in 1867 with a degree in history. He then relocated to Italy, then Berlin (where he studied Roman law and history), and subsequently Heidelberg where he studied art history under archaeologist Karl Friedrichs (1831-1871). In 1869 Goodyear traveled with Friedrichs to Syria and Cyprus, then spent 1870 in Venice and Pisa where he studied the Leaning Tower of Pisa.

In 1871 he married Sarah Sanford, his first of three wives, and taught at Cooper Union until 1882, when he was hired as first curator of the new Metropolitan Museum of Art. In 1888 Goodyear published a popular survey of art history, and in 1899 was appointed curator of art at the Brooklyn Institute of Arts and Sciences (today the Brooklyn Museum of Art). From 1895-1914 he conducted a series of studies in which he photographed and measured European buildings.

William H. Goodyear died in 1923 of pneumonia and was buried in Green-Wood Cemetery in Brooklyn. Wilford S. Conrow, who had painted his portrait in 1916 [BMA, Department of Painting and Sculpture, 25.182], wrote a memorial to his life and work for the Brooklyn Museum Quarterly of July 1923. In this piece Conrow further emphasizes and praises the importance of the discovery of architectural refinements in Goodyear's life and the value of his work to the fields of architecture and art. He concludes by stating that “our present duty, the responsibility that we must accept, is to preserve and spread this precious, long-lost knowledge in order that it may play its full, qualifying role in the creative arts of the future.”

Goodyear Archival Collection at the Brooklyn Museum

William Henry Goodyear was the Brooklyn Museum's first curator of fine arts from 1899–1923. Goodyear was a vital force in the early years of the Museum's fine arts department as well as doing extensive research in art history and architectural theory. Within this collection of correspondence, scrapbooks, notes, clippings, and expedition diaries, are images of medieval cathedrals, churches, and mosques taken between 1895 and 1914 that he used for his architectural research.

The collection includes a wide variety of materials, including correspondence, expedition diaries, notes, lectures, reports, writings (both published and unpublished), photographs, plates of photographs, lantern slides, clippings, and scrapbooks. It also includes an extensive set of photographs and lantern slides of buildings, monuments, and other views taken during the Paris Exposition of 1900, presenting a visual tour of the exposition.

Additional Goodyear records can be found in other repositories. Of note are the A. Kingsley Porter papers at Harvard University and the John Weir Papers and Charles Sheldon Hastings Papers at Yale University. The National Museum of American History, Smithsonian Institution, holds 199 silver gelatin paper print enlargements of the 1900 Paris Exposition photographs. Five hundred and sixty-four enlargements of architectural refinements photographs (1895–1905), which Goodyear used in exhibitions, were donated by the BIAS to the National Museum of American History in 1901 and then transferred to the Cooper-Hewitt National Design Museum, Smithsonian Institution, in 1974.

The majority of Goodyear's publications are held by the Brooklyn Museum Libraries.

Research

Goodyear developed a theory that medieval churches throughout Europe displayed curved lines, concave walls, widening naves and other asymmetries, that were not accidental phenomena created by settling stone or poor construction, but the original architects' deliberate inventions. Goodyear called these deviations "architectural refinements."

Between the years 1895 and 1914, Goodyear conducted survey expeditions to Europe, Turkey, Egypt and Greece visiting medieval cathedrals, churches, and mosques, meticulously noting the measurements of piers, transepts, apses, etc. and taking numerous photographs of these details in his efforts to document the occurrences of refinements. The photographs taken during these expeditions provide not only the visual key to his work on refinements but are also valuable records of medieval churches and cathedrals before the world wars.

On his 1895 research expedition to Italy he was accompanied by photographer John McKecknie and took additional images of objects within Italian museums. In 1900, Goodyear traveled to the Paris Exposition with photographer Joseph Hawkes. They brought back numerous images from the exposition including street life, vistas, pavilions, statues, and other structures and decorative details.

Ultimately, Goodyear hoped to publish his findings and observations on medieval architecture as a scholarly book, a goal that he never met. His results, however, were published from time to time in articles in the American Journal of Archaeology, the Architectural Record; the American Architect; the Architect and Contract Reporter (London); Building News and Engineering Journal (London); Architectural Review (London); Journal of the Archaeological Institute; Journal of the Royal Institute of British Architects; Reports of the Smithsonian Institution; Revue de L’Art Chretien; Brooklyn Institute Bulletin; and in a Brooklyn Museum publication series, Memoirs of Art and Archaeology.

Summary of Survey Expeditions:

1895
Italy (circa May – October). Included visits to Ancona, Arezzo, Assisi, Bari, Bologna, Borgo San Donnino, Chiusi, Cremona, Ferrara, Fiesole, Florence, Foligno, Genoa, Girgenti, Lucca, Milan, Modena, Naples, Orvieto, Padua, Paestum, Palermo, Pavia, Perugia, Piazcenza, Pisa, Pompeii, Ravello, Ravenna, Rimini, Rome, Ruvo, Santa Maria del Giudice, Selinus, Siena, Toscanella, Trani, Troja, Venice, Verona, Vetralla, Vicenza, Viterbo, Volterra.

Sites visited included San Nicola, Bari; Troja Cathedral; San Paolo Fuori, Rome; San Pietro, Toscanella; Santa Maria Della Pieve, Arezzo; Siena Cathedral; San Michele, Lucca; Pisa Cathedral; San Marco, Venice; San Lorenzo, Vicenza; San Michele, Pavia; Sant’ Ambrogio and Sant’ Eustorgio, Milan.

1901	
Italy (July – September). Included visits to Arezzo, Bologna, Brescia, Burano, Calci, Cavalieri, Cremona, Este, Florence, Genoa, Lombardy, Lucca, Mantua, Massa Marittima, Milan, Murano, Naples, Orvieto, Parma, Pavia, Pisa, Pozzuoli, Rome, Sarzana, Siena, Testa, Torcello, Venice, Verona, Vicenza.
Sites visited included the Cathedral, Tower, San Nicola, San Paolo a Ripa d’Arno and other churches in Pisa; Sant’ Ambrogio, Milan; San Marco, Venice.

1903	
Northern France, Austria, and Turkey (July – September). Included visits to Amiens, Angoulême, Bayeux, Beauvais, Caen, Chalons, Chartres, Coutances, Dol, Évreux, Laon, Lisieux, Noyon, Paris, Pontorson, Rheims, Rouen, Soissons; Strassburg; Vienna; Istanbul.
Sites visited included Notre Dame, Paris; Noyon Cathedral; Amiens Cathedral; Church of S. Sophia, S. Mary Diaconissa, Church of the Monastery of the Chora (Korah), Balaban Aja Mesjid, Istanbul; Strassburg Cathedral.

1905	
Northern France and Northern Italy (July). Included visits to Amiens, Paris, Milan, Venice, Vicenza.
Sites visited included Amiens Cathedral; San Marco, Venice.

1907	
France (May – August). Included visits to Amiens, Beauvais, Chalons, Laon, Noyon, Paris, Rheims, Rouen, St. Quentin.
Sites visited included Amiens Cathedral; St. Loup, Chalons; St. Ouen, Rouen; Notre Dame, Paris.

1910	
Italy and France (May – June). Included visits to Florence, Pisa, Paris, Rouen.
Sites visited included Cathedral, Tower, and Baptistry at Pisa; Notre Dame, Paris.

1914	
Egypt, Greece, Turkey, Europe, Ireland, and England (February – August). Included visits to Abydos, Cairo, Efou, Illahun, Thebes, Salonica, Istanbul, Vienna, Cologne, Ostend, Aachen, Dublin, Bristol, Canterbury, Chester, Chichester, Durham, Exeter, Gloucester, Hereford, Hexham, Lichfield, Lincoln, London, Peterborough, Salisbury, Tewkesbury, Winchester, Worcester, York.
Sites visited included St. Demetrius, Salonica; St. Sophia, St. Mary Diaconissa, Balaban Aja Mesjid, Istanbul; St. Patrick's and Christ Church, Dublin; St. John's, Chester; Temple Church, London; Salisbury Cathedral; Lichfield Cathedral.

Publications

During the time he was traveling and organizing exhibitions, Goodyear published many articles, letters, and reviews in scientific, architectural, and literary journals and newspapers. While he had published full-length works on art history, Goodyear did not publish his first book devoted entirely to refinements until 1912. Goodyear described Greek Refinements as a “long-needed addition to the knowledge of Greek temple architecture, considered as a wholly independent study. Up to date there has been no book for general readers on the subject of the Greek refinements.”

Gallery

Paris Exposition 1900

Survey Expedition

Selected works 

 Memoranda for Lectures on the History and Development of Art, 1872.
 A History of Art, New York: A. S. Barnes, 1888.
 The Grammar of the Lotus: a New History of Classic Ornament as a Development of Sun Worship,  London: Sampson Low, Marston, 1891.
 Renaissance and Modern Art, New York: Macmillan, 1900.
 Illustrated Catalogue of Photographs & Surveys of Architectural Refinements in Medieval Buildings lent by the Brooklyn Museum of Arts and Sciences, Edinburgh: Morrison and Gibb, 1905.
 Greek Refinements: Studies in Temperamental Architecture, New Haven: The Yale University Press, 1912.

References 

 Dictionary of Art Historians entry
 The National Cyclopaedia of American Biography, 19, 1926: pages 455–456.
 Dictionary of American Biography, 7, 1931: pages 416–417.
 "Prof. W. H. Goodyear, Archaeologist, Dies: Curator of Brooklyn Institute of Arts and Sciences a Victim of Pneumonia at 77.", New York Times, February 20, 1923, page 17.
 Guide to the Goodyear Archival Collection Brooklyn Museum Archives 

American archaeologists
American art historians
1846 births
1923 deaths
Burials at Green-Wood Cemetery
Deaths from pneumonia in New York (state)
Cooper Union faculty